Michael Henderson (1951–2022) was an American musician.

Michael Henderson may also refer to:

Michael Henderson (author) (born 1932), English journalist and author of ten books, mainly on forgiveness
Michael Henderson (doctor) (born 1937), vehicle safety researcher
Michael Henderson (fencer) (born 1935), New Zealand fencer
Michael Henderson (rugby league) (born 1984), Australian rugby league player
Michael Henderson (writer) (born 1958), British journalist, sports and cultural journalism
J. Michael Henderson (born 1945), American surgeon
Mick Henderson (born 1956), English association footballer
Mike Henderson (born 1953), American singer-songwriter
Mike Henderson (politician) (born 1958/59), American politician